Patrice Lefebvre (born June 28, 1967) is a Canadian-born Italian former ice hockey player. Lefebvre played three games in the National Hockey League for the Washington Capitals during the 1998–99 NHL season.

Biography
Lefebvre was born in Montreal, Quebec. As a youth, he played in the 1979 Quebec International Pee-Wee Hockey Tournament with a minor ice hockey team from Ville-Émard.

Despite putting up impressive numbers with the Shawinigan Cataractes in the QMJHL he was never drafted by an NHL-team, possibly due to his small stature (Lefebvre is listed as 5 ft 6 in (1,68 m) and 160 lb (73 kg)).

Later in his career Lefebvre has played in DEL, Serie A, Oddset Ligaen and Nationalliga B. At the beginning of his career he also played in France and Nationalliga A.

In 2006 Lefebvre became an Italian citizen (he is married to an Italian woman) and played 2007 World Championship with the Azzurri.

Titles
Most Valuable Player (IHL 97/98){James Gatschene Memorial Trophy, www.hockeydb.com}
Top Scorer (IHL 97/98){Leo P. Lamoureux Memorial Trophy, www.hockeydb.com}
All Time Best Scorer (QMJHL)
All Time Most Assists(QMJHL)
Most assists NLB 2006–07

Career statistics

Regular season and playoffs

International

References

External links

1967 births
Adler Mannheim players
Canadian ice hockey right wingers
EHC Biel players
Frankfurt Lions players
French Quebecers
HC Ajoie players
HC Milano players
HC Sierre players
HC Valpellice players
Italian ice hockey players
Italian people of Canadian descent
EHC Kloten players
Las Vegas Thunder players
Lausanne HC players
Louisville Icehawks players
Living people
Milwaukee Admirals (IHL) players
Rødovre Mighty Bulls players
SG Pontebba players
Shawinigan Cataractes players
SCL Tigers players
Springfield Indians players
Undrafted National Hockey League players
Washington Capitals players
Ice hockey people from Montreal
Montreal Roadrunners players
Canadian expatriate ice hockey players in Denmark
Canadian expatriate ice hockey players in Italy